Niitvälja Bog is a fen in Estonia, Harju County. It is situated in the territory of both Lääne-Harju Parish and Keila city and has a size about 100 hectares.

In 2013 an inventory of protected vascular plant species was done at Niitvälja bog by the members of the Estonian Orchid Protection Club. Seven species were found belonging to the 2nd category 
of protected species in Estonia and 13 species from the 3rd category.

Gallery

References 

Bogs of Estonia
Lääne-Harju Parish